Matveyevskaya is a rural locality (a village) in Gorodishchenskoye Rural Settlement, Nyuksensky District, Vologda Oblast, Russia. The population was 139 as of 2002.

Geography 
Matveyevskaya is located 41 km southeast of Nyuksenitsa (the district's administrative centre) by road. Kosmarevskaya Kuliga is the nearest rural locality.

References 

Rural localities in Nyuksensky District